Abdelhak Belahmeur (born 26 July 1991) is a French professional footballer, of Algerian descent, who plays as a midfielder for SR Colmar.

References

External links
 
 Abdelhak Belahmeur at lequipe.fr
 

1991 births
Living people
French footballers
French expatriate footballers
Footballers from Strasbourg
French sportspeople of Algerian descent
Association football midfielders
SC Schiltigheim players
Championnat National players
RC Strasbourg Alsace players
US Créteil-Lusitanos players
US Avranches players
SR Colmar players
Liga I players
FC Voluntari players
French expatriate sportspeople in Romania
Expatriate footballers in Romania